Joshua James Hunt (born 3 April 1991 in Torquay) is an English former racing cyclist, who rode professionally between 2013 and 2018. He took up cycling at the age of 16, receiving his first bike from his half-brother, racing cyclist Jeremy Hunt.

Since retiring, Hunt now works as a cycling performance coach.

References

External links 

Joshua Hunt - British Cycling

1991 births
Living people
English male cyclists
Sportspeople from Torquay